Ambassadors representing Montenegro abroad. Listed in alphabetical order by country.

List of ambassadors
 - Željko Perović 
 - Dragana Radulović
 - Vesko Garčević
 - Radovan Miljanić
 - Ljiljana Tošković
 - -
 - Irena Radović 
 - Vladimir Radulović
General Consul Abid Crnovršanin in Frankfurt
 - Ivo Armenko
 - Antun Sbutega 
 - Vanja Brailo
 - Vojin Vlahović 
 - Ferhat Dinosha
 - Dušan Mrdović
 - Ivan Leković
 - Slobodan Backović

 - Ranko Milović 
 -  Igor Jovović
 - Ljubiša Perović
 - Ramo Bralić
 - Ljubiša Stanković
 - Ljubomir Mišurović
 - Nebojša Kaluđerović
General Consul Branko Milić in New York City
 - Aleksandar Eraković

Non residential
 - Željko Radulović  in Podgorica
 - Nebojša Kaluđerović  in Washington, D.C.
- Milorad Šćepanović in New York City
- Milorad Šćepanović in New York City 
- Dragana Radulović in Vienna
- Nikola Ciko in Podgorica
- Nebojša Kaluđerović  in Washington, D.C.
 - Željko Radulović  in Podgorica
 - Vojin Vlahović in Rome
 - Irena Radović in Paris
- Milorad Šćepanović in New York City
 - Vojin Vlahović in Rome
- Dragana Radulović in Vienna
 - Antun Sbutega

List of Ambassadors to international organizations
- Dragana Radulović, Organization for Security and Co-operation in Europe and other organizations in Vienna 
 - Ana Vukadinović, Council of Europe in Strasbourg
 - Aleksandar Pejović, European Union in Brussels 
- Vesko Garčević, NATO in Brussels
 - Milorad Šćepanović, UN in New York City
 - Ljubiša Stanković, UN in Geneva
 - Irena Radović, UNESCO in Paris

See also
Montenegrin diplomatic missions
Foreign relations of Montenegro

References

External links
The Njegoskij Fund Network: Foreign Representations in Montenegro
The Njegoskij Fund Network: Montenegrin Representations Abroad
The Njegoskij Fund Network: Today's Montenegro >> Diplomacy
Embassy of Montenegro in Austria
Embassy of Montenegro in Macedonia
Consulate-General of Montenegro in New York City
The Njegoskij Fund Network: "ambacg-fr.eu", the portal dedicated to the activities of the Embassy of Montenegro in France

Politics of Montenegro
Montenegro
Main